Defending champion Rafael Nadal defeated Daniil Medvedev in the final, 6–3, 6–0 to win the men's singles tennis title at the 2019 Canadian Open. It was the first time Nadal successfully defended a hard court title.

Seeds
The top eight seeds receive a bye into the second round.

Draw

Finals

Top half

Section 1

Section 2

Bottom half

Section 3

Section 4

Qualifying

Seeds

Qualifiers

Lucky loser
  John Millman

Qualifying draw

First qualifier

Second qualifier

Third qualifier

Fourth qualifier

Fifth qualifier

Sixth qualifier

Seventh qualifier

References

External links
Main Draw
Qualifying Draw

Men's Singles